Vice Admiral Sir Robert Walmsley,  (1 February 1941 – 4 August 2022) was a senior officer of the Royal Navy who served as Chief of Defence Procurement at the UK Ministry of Defence from 1996 to 2003.

Early career
Robert Walmsley was born in Aberdeen, Scotland, on 1 February 1941, a son of the anatomist Robert Walmsley and Dr Isabel Mary Walmsley. He was educated at Fettes College in Edinburgh. He joined the Royal Navy as a Dartmouth Cadet in 1958, and went on to read Mechanical Sciences at Queens' College, Cambridge, before taking up a range of seagoing appointments, mainly in submarines, developing an expertise in nuclear propulsion. During his naval career he was at times Chairman of the Naval Nuclear Technical Safety Panel and Director General, Submarines. For three years, he was the Assistant Chief of the Defence Staff for Communications, Command, Control and Information Systems. His final naval appointment (in 1994) was as Controller of the Navy and member of the Navy Board as a vice admiral. He was appointed a Knight Commander of the Order of the Bath in the 1995 Birthday Honours.

Walmsley was a Cambridge Blue, having coxed the light blue boat to victory in the 108th Oxford and Cambridge Boat Race in 1962. He was a Fellow of the Royal Academy of Engineering, the Royal Society of Arts, and the Institution of Engineering and Technology (IET), and was an Honorary DSc of Cranfield University.

Chief of Defence Procurement

After retiring from the navy, Walmsley held the position of Chief of Defence Procurement at the UK Ministry of Defence from 1996 until his retirement on 30 April 2003. He retired from the Her Majesty's Civil Service after serving longer in the Defence Procurement post than any of his predecessors. During Walmsley's period in post he led the transformation of the procurement organisation into the Defence Procurement Agency (DPA, now Defence Equipment and Support) and made numerous appearances as a witness to Parliamentary select committees.

Personal life and death
Sir Robert was married twice.  He married his first wife, Christina Melvill, in 1967.  The couple had one son and two daughters.  Daughter, Emma Walmsley, is currently chief executive of the global pharmaceutical company Glaxo Smithkline.

 was launched by Christina, Lady Walmsley in 1996. This launch made naval history since Lady Walmsley broke with tradition and used a bottle of Macallan whisky; up until this time Royal Navy ships had always been launched with a bottle of champagne.

Sir Robert and Christina's marriage dissolved in 2009 and in 2010 Sir Robert married his second wife Alexandra Ashbourne.

Sir Robert Walmsley died suddenly in Cape Cod, Massachusetts on 4 August 2022, at the age of 81.

Corporate roles
 Chairman of the Board of the Major Projects Association
 Non-executive director of Cohort plc
 Non-executive director of General Dynamics Corporation
 Non-executive director of Ultra Electronics Holdings
 Senior advisor at Morgan Stanley International plc
 Former Director of EDO Corporation (now ITT Exelis) and chairman of the board of EDO (UK) plc
 Former non-executive director of British Energy Group plc
 Former non-executive director of Stratos Global Corporation (now Inmarsat)
 Senior adviser to Fluor Corporation
 Non-executive director of Ultra Electronics

References

1941 births
2022 deaths
Royal Navy officers
United Kingdom defence procurement
Royal Navy vice admirals
Military personnel from Aberdeen
Knights Commander of the Order of the Bath
People educated at Fettes College
Fellows of the Institution of Engineering and Technology
Fellows of the Royal Academy of Engineering
Alumni of Queens' College, Cambridge
Walmsley family